Tsukasa Watanabe (born 16 February 1957) is a Japanese professional golfer.

Watanabe was born in Tokyo. He played on the Japan Golf Tour, winning twice, and earned over 750,000,000 ¥. He played on the 1994 International Team in the Presidents Cup.

Professional wins (8)

Japan Golf Tour wins (2)

Japan Golf Tour playoff record (0–3)

Other wins (1)
1993 Sanko Grand Summer Championship

Japan PGA Senior Tour wins (5)
2008 Japan PGA Senior Championship, Fujifilm Senior Championship
2009 Japan Senior Open
2013 Japan PGA Senior Championship
2015 Fuji Film Senior Championship

Results in major championships

Note: Watanabe only played in The Open Championship.
"T" = tied

Team appearances
This list may be incomplete.
Four Tours World Championship (representing Japan): 1991
Presidents Cup (International Team): 1994
Alfred Dunhill Cup (representing Japan): 1995, 1997, 2000

References

External links

Japanese male golfers
Japan Golf Tour golfers
Sportspeople from Tokyo
1957 births
Living people